Sergiu Cioban (born 7 March 1988) is a Moldovan former professional road cyclist.

Major results

2006
 6th Overall Tour du Pays de Vaud
 9th Time trial, UCI Junior Road World Championships
2007
 6th Chrono Champenois
2008
 National Road Championships
1st  Time trial
2nd Road race
2009
 8th Overall Grand Prix du Portugal
2010
 National Road Championships
1st  Time trial
3rd Road race
 8th Overall Tour of Szeklerland
 9th Overall Tour of Romania
2011
 National Road Championships
1st  Time trial
3rd Road race
 6th Overall Tour of Szeklerland
2012
 National Road Championships
1st  Time trial
2nd Road race
 4th Grand Prix Dobrich I
2013
 National Road Championships
1st  Time trial
2nd Road race
 2nd Košice–Miskolc
 4th Overall Romanian Cycling Tour
2014
 National Road Championships
1st  Time trial
1st  Road race

References

External links

1988 births
Living people
Moldovan male cyclists
Sportspeople from Chișinău
European Games competitors for Moldova
Cyclists at the 2015 European Games